AAJ or Aaj may refer to:

 Aaj (film), a 1987 film directed by Mahesh Bhatt
 AAJ TV, a television station in Pakistan
 Daily Aaj, an Urdu publication
 American Alpine Journal, a publication of the American Alpine Club
 Australian Army Journal, a publication of the Australian Army
 American Association for Justice, a U.S. legal organization (formerly Association of Trial Lawyers of America, ATLA)
 Cayana Airstrip (IATA code), Suriname

See also
 Aj (newspaper), an Indian newspaper